Notre Jour Viendra OST is a 2010 album by the French artist SebastiAn. It is the soundtrack to the film of the same name directed by Romain Gavras.

Track listing 

Track Records albums
Drama film soundtracks
Sebastian (French musician) albums
2010 soundtrack albums